Mariam Dalakishvili (born 7 November 2001) is a Georgian tennis player.

Dalakishvili has a career high WTA singles ranking of 791, achieved on 14 October 2019. She also has a career high WTA doubles ranking of 849, achieved on 14 October 2019.

Dalakishvili represents Georgia in the Fed Cup.

References

External links
 
 
 

2001 births
Living people
Female tennis players from Georgia (country)
Sportspeople from Tbilisi